Golden Fish is a 2010 South Korean drama television series starring Park Sang-won, Lee Tae-gon, Jo Yoon-hee, and So Yoo-jin. The daily drama aired on MBC on Mondays to Fridays at 20:15 from May 3 to November 11, 2010 for 133 episodes.

Plot
Lee Tae-young has long been hardened from growing up in an unloving family. The only person whom he can open his heart to is his stepsister Han Ji-min, but their love is tested by his stepmother's manipulations and the cruelty of fate.

Cast and characters
Park Sang-won as Moon Jung-ho
He's the chairman of the Jungin Medical Foundation and also the director of a prestigious general hospital while carrying on his duties as a university president. In the professional arena, he is a calculating person who makes management decisions without any emotion, but in his personal life, he displays a liberal and free-spirited streak. He is a natural charmer and attracts many ladies but he always holds back from falling in love. However, his outlook on life is turned upside down after he meets the young and comely ballerina, Ji-min.

Lee Tae-gon as Lee Tae-young
A doctor. He's a handsome man and talented surgeon. He lost his mother when he was seven years old and his father was never a part of his life since he was born. So he was taken in by Kyung-san and grew up with his family. He doesn't open up to people easily but he is very tender towards Ji-min.

Jo Yoon-hee as Han Ji-min
A prima ballerina. Like her father, she's a warmhearted person and very attractive. For 23 years, she only loved Tae-young but he breaks her heart by abruptly leaving her life. She loses her father, her dreams and the man she loved all at once. Amidst this turmoil, she becomes a changed person.

So Yoo-jin as Moon Hyun-jin 
Jung-ho's daughter and Tae-young's wife. Her first husband died while she was pregnant with their baby and she became a single mom all of a sudden. She falls in love with Tae-young who operated on her ailing daughter Seo-yeon. She asks Tae-young out and they eventually get married. But she constantly worries that he'll leave her one day.

Han family
Kim Yong-gun as Han Kyung-san
Youn Yuh-jung as Jo Yoon-hee
Park Ki-woong as Han Kang-min
Guzal Tursunova as Rebecca
Seo Seung-man as Jo Yoon-woo

Moon family
Jung Hye-sun as Mrs. Kang (Jung-ho's mother)
Lee Il-hwa as Moon Jung-won (Jung-ho's sister)
Lee Hae-woo as Moon Seok-jin (Jung-ho's son)
Kang Ye-seo as Moon Seo-yeon (Hyun-jin's daughter)

Extended cast
Kim Bo-yeon as Lee Se-rin
Hwang Seung-eon as Yoon Myung-ji
Lee Hae-in as Seo Joo-hee
Yoon Eun-young as Hyo-won (Ji-min's friend)
Lee Hyung-suk as Yook Gong-dol (Jung-ho's driver/assistant)
Kim Soo-hyun as Miss Hwang (Mrs. Kang's secretary)
Choi Su-rin as Park Ji-hye (Tae-young's deceased mother)
Kim Ji-young as Gong-dol's grandmother
Heo Tae-hee as Hyun-ji's date
Ha Soo-ho as Kyung Ho-won
Shin Jong-hoon
Lee Do-yeop

Awards and nominations
2010 MBC Drama Awards 
PD Award: Lee Tae-gon
Golden Acting Award, Actor in a Serial Drama: Park Sang-won
Golden Acting Award, Actress in a Serial Drama: Kim Bo-yeon
Best New Actress: Jo Yoon-hee
Writer of the Year: Jo Eun-jung
Nominated - Top Excellence Award, Actor: Lee Tae-gon
Nominated - Excellence Award, Actress: So Yoo-jin

2010 International Emmys 
Shortlisted for Best Telenovela

International broadcast

It aired in Vietnam on Hanoi Television on April 17, 2012, called Cá vàng

References

External links
Golden Fish official MBC website 
Golden Fish at MBC Global Media

MBC TV television dramas
2010 South Korean television series debuts
2010 South Korean television series endings
Korean-language television shows
South Korean melodrama television series
South Korean romance television series